Gymnothamnion elegans (syn. Callithamnion elegans Schousboe ex C.Agardh 1828) is a red alga species in the genus Gymnothamnion found in South Africa from Bakoven on Cape Peninsula to KwaZulu-Natal.

Subspecies 
 Gymnothamnion elegans var. bisporum Stegenga 1986, (Hout Bay to East London, endemic)

See also 
 List of seaweeds of South Africa

References

External links 

 Gymnothamnion elegans at algaebase.org

Ceramiales
Plants described in 1892
Taxa named by Carl Adolph Agardh